Shannon Watt (born 26 November 1980) is a former Australian rules footballer for the North Melbourne Football Club in the Australian Football League (AFL).

From Cavendish in rural Victoria, Watt, a key defender, was drafted at number 14 in the 1997 National AFL Draft from the North Ballarat Rebels. He played as a fullback until Jonathan Hay came to the club in 2006 who unsuccessfully filled the role of centre half-back.

Despite playing 155 AFL games, Watt never polled a single vote in the Brownlow Medal.  Watt was one of the last individuals to have played every minute of every game for an entire season on the ground (no interchange time) in 2003, a feat practically unheard of in the modern era.

He announced his retirement from the game on 20 August 2009.

References

External links
Shannon Watt's player profile

North Melbourne Football Club players
Australian rules footballers from Victoria (Australia)
1980 births
Living people
Greater Western Victoria Rebels players
North Ballarat Football Club players